Abdelrahman Wael Mahmoud Abow (born 7 September 1995) is an Egyptian taekwondo competitor. He represented Egypt at the 2020 Summer Olympics held in Tokyo, Japan after qualifying at the 2020 African Taekwondo Olympic Qualification Tournament held in Rabat, Morocco.

Career 

He competed in the men's featherweight event at the 2017 World Taekwondo Championships held in Muju, South Korea.

At the 2018 African Taekwondo Championships held in Agadir, Morocco, he won the gold medal in the men's 68 kg event. In 2019, he competed in the men's featherweight event at the World Taekwondo Championships without winning a medal. A few months later, he represented Egypt at the 2019 African Games held in Rabat, Morocco and he won the silver medal in the men's 68 kg event. In the final, he lost against Ismael Yacouba of Niger.

At the 2021 African Taekwondo Championships held in Dakar, Senegal, he won the gold medal in the men's 68 kg event. He competed in the men's 68 kg event at the 2020 Summer Olympics held in Tokyo, Japan.

References

External links 
 

Living people
1995 births
Place of birth missing (living people)
Egyptian male taekwondo practitioners
African Games medalists in taekwondo
African Games silver medalists for Egypt
Competitors at the 2019 African Games
African Taekwondo Championships medalists
Taekwondo practitioners at the 2020 Summer Olympics
Olympic taekwondo practitioners of Egypt
Universiade medalists for Egypt
Universiade medalists in taekwondo
Medalists at the 2019 Summer Universiade
21st-century Egyptian people